Barton County is a county located in the southwestern part of the U.S. state of Missouri. As of the 2020 census, the population was 11,637. Its county seat is Lamar. The county was organized in 1855 and named after U.S. Senator David Barton from Missouri.

President Harry S. Truman was born in Barton County in 1884. The female bandit, Little Britches, was born in Barton County in 1879.

Geography

Adjacent counties
Vernon County (north)
Cedar County (northeast)
Dade County (east)
Jasper County (south)
Crawford County, Kansas (west)

Major highways
 Interstate 49
 U.S. Route 71
 U.S. Route 160
 Route 43
 Route 126

Airport
Lamar Municipal Airport (LLU) serves the county and surrounding communities.

Demographics

As of the census of 2000, there were 12,541 people, 4,895 households, and 3,441 families residing in the county. The population density was 21 people per square mile (8/km2). There were 5,409 housing units at an average density of 9 per square mile (4/km2). The racial makeup of the county was 96.93% White, 0.29% Black or African American, 0.83% Native American, 0.28% Asian, 0.10% Pacific Islander, 0.14% from other races, and 1.44% from two or more races. 0.95% of the population were Hispanic or Latino of any race.

There were 4,895 households, out of which 34.00% had children under the age of 18 living with them, 58.10% were married couples living together, 8.50% had a female householder with no husband present, and 29.70% were non-families. 26.40% of all households were made up of individuals, and 13.30% had someone living alone who was 65 years of age or older. The average household size was 2.53 and the average family size was 3.04.

In the county, the population was spread out, with 27.50% under the age of 18, 8.30% from 18 to 24, 26.10% from 25 to 44, 21.70% from 45 to 64, and 16.50% who were 65 years of age or older. The median age was 37 years. For every 100 females there were 96.00 males. For every 100 females age 18 and over, there were 92.40 males.

The median income for a household in the county was $29,275, and the median income for a family was $35,638. Males had a median income of $25,254 versus $19,663 for females. The per capita income for the county was $13,987. About 11.00% of families and 13.00% of the population were below the poverty line, including 13.90% of those under age 18 and 16.80% of those age 65 or over.

Religion
According to the Association of Religion Data Archives County Membership Report (2010), Barton County is regarded as a part of the Bible Belt, with evangelical Protestantism being the most predominant religion. The most predominant denominations among residents in Barton County who adhere to a religion are Southern Baptists (29.18%), United Methodists (26.59%), and Christian Churches and Churches of Christ (12.96%).

2020 Census

Education

Public schools
Liberal R-II School District - Liberal
Liberal Elementary School (PK-05)
Liberal Middle School (06-08)
Liberal High School (09-12)
Lamar R-I School District - Lamar
Lamar East Primary School (K-02)
Lamar Elementary School (03-05)
Lamar Middle School (06-08)
Lamar High School (09-12)
Golden City R-III School District - Golden City
Golden City Elementary School (PK-06)
Golden City High School (07-12)

Public libraries
Barton County Library  
Sheldon City Library

Politics

Local
Republicans control politics at the local level in Barton County, holding all of the elected positions in the county.

State

All of Barton County is a part of Missouri's 127th Legislative District in the Missouri House of Representatives and is represented by Ann Kelley (R-Lamar).

All of Barton County is a part of Missouri's 31st Senatorial District in the Missouri Senate and is represented by Rick Brattin (R-Harrisonville).

Federal
All of Barton County is included in Missouri's 4th Congressional District and is represented by Vicky Hartzler (R-Harrisonville) in the U.S. House of Representatives. Hartzler was elected to a sixth term in 2020 over Democratic challenger Lindsey Simmons.

Barton County, along with the rest of the state of Missouri, is represented in the U.S. Senate by Josh Hawley (R-Columbia) and Roy Blunt (R-Strafford).

Blunt was elected to a second term in 2016 over then-Missouri Secretary of State Jason Kander.

Political culture

At the presidential level, Barton County is overwhelmingly Republican. Barton County strongly favored Donald Trump in both 2016 and 2020. A Democrat hasn't carried the county in a presidential election since Lyndon Johnson in 1964. Like most rural areas throughout Missouri, voters in Barton County generally adhere to socially and culturally conservative principles which tend to influence their Republican leanings.

Missouri presidential preference primaries

2020
The 2020 presidential primaries for both the Democratic and Republican parties were held in Missouri on March 10. On the Democratic side, former Vice President Joe Biden (D-Delaware) both won statewide and carried Barton County by a wide margin. Biden went on to defeat President Donald Trump in the general election.

Incumbent President Donald Trump (R-Florida) faced a primary challenge from former Massachusetts Governor Bill Weld, but won both Barton County and statewide by overwhelming margins.

2016
The 2016 presidential primaries for both the Republican and Democratic parties were held in Missouri on March 15. Businessman Donald Trump (R-New York) narrowly won the state overall, but Senator Ted Cruz (R-Texas) carried a majority of the vote in Barton County. Trump went on to win the nomination and the presidency.

On the Democratic side, former Secretary of State Hillary Clinton (D-New York) won statewide by a small margin, but Senator Bernie Sanders (I-Vermont) narrowly won Barton County.

2012
The 2012 Missouri Republican Presidential Primary's results were nonbinding on the state's national convention delegates. Voters in Barton County supported former U.S. Senator Rick Santorum (R-Pennsylvania), who finished first in the state at large, but eventually lost the nomination to former Governor Mitt Romney (R-Massachusetts). Delegates to the congressional district and state conventions were chosen at a county caucus, which selected a delegation favoring Santorum. Incumbent President Barack Obama easily won the Missouri Democratic Primary and renomination. He defeated Romney in the general election.

2008
In 2008, the Missouri Republican Presidential Primary was closely contested, with Senator John McCain (R-Arizona) prevailing and eventually winning the nomination. However, former Arkansas Governor Mike Huckabee won a clear majority among Barton County Republicans, receiving more votes than any other candidate in either major party.

Then-Senator Hillary Clinton (D-New York) carried Barton County in the 2008 Democratic presidential primary. Despite initial reports that Clinton had won Missouri, Barack Obama (D-Illinois), also a Senator at the time, narrowly defeated her statewide and later became that year's Democratic nominee, going on to win the presidency.

Communities

Cities
Golden City
Lamar (county seat)
Liberal
Mindenmines

Villages
Burgess
Lamar Heights
Milford

Census-designated place
Irwin

Other unincorporated places
Boston
 Bushnell
 Doylesport
Dublin
 Esrom
 Hannon
Iantha
Kenoma
Nashville
 Newport
 Oakton
 Oskaloosa
 Verdella

Townships
Barton County is divided into fifteen townships:

Notable people

 Blaine Durbin — Major League Baseball player with Chicago Cubs, Cincinnati Reds and Pittsburgh Pirates in early 20th century
 Wyatt Earp and family — famous frontier lawman
 Bob Harmon, Major League Baseball player with St. Louis Cardinals and Pittsburgh Pirates in early 20th century
 Charles Henry Morgan — U.S. Representative from Missouri as both a Democrat (1875–79, 1883–85) and a Republican (1909–11)
 Harry S. Truman — 33rd President of the United States (1945–1953); 34th Vice President of the United States (1945-1945), became president upon death of Franklin Delano Roosevelt in 1945; U.S. Senator (D-Missouri) (1935-1945)

See also
National Register of Historic Places listings in Barton County, Missouri

References

External links

http://www.bartoncounty.com/
 Digitized 1930 Plat Book of Barton County  from University of Missouri Division of Special Collections, Archives, and Rare Books

 
Missouri counties
1855 establishments in Missouri